Tourism in Cambodia is one of the most important sectors in the country's economy. In 2013, tourism arrivals increased by 17.5 percent year on year, with business travelers increasing 47 percent.

Annual statistics

Ranking of international visitor arrivals

* Country in ASEAN

Major attractions

World Heritage Sites

 Angkor
 Preah Vihear Temple
 Sambor Prei Kuk

Museums

 Angkor National Museum
 Cambodian Cultural Village
 National Museum of Cambodia

Natural areas

 Bou Sra Waterfall
 Lake Yeak Laom
 Phnom Kulen
 Phnom Santuk
 Tonle Sap

National parks

 Angkor Borei and Phnom Da
 Botum Sakor National Park
 Kep National Park
 Kirirom National Park
 Phnom Kulen National Park
 Preah Monivong National Park
 Ream National Park
 Virachey National Park
 Southern Cardamom National Park

Cities

 Battambang
 Kampot
 Kratié
 Phnom Penh
 Siem Reap
 Sihanoukville

Other

 Banteay Chhmar
 Banteay Prey Nokor
 Banteay Srei
 Beng Mealea
 Bokor Hill Station
 Khmer Ceramics & Fine Arts Centre
 Koh Ker
 Oudong
 Phnom Tamao Wildlife Rescue Centre
 Preah Khan Kompong Svay
 Silver Pagoda
 Royal Palace of Cambodia

See also
Visa policy of Cambodia
History of Cambodia
Culture of Cambodia
Dance of Cambodia
Clothing of Cambodia
Cuisine of Cambodia
List of mammals in Cambodia
List of birds of Cambodia
List of islands of Cambodia
Khmer language

References

External links
 All Cambodia Information site go to https://web.archive.org/web/20160403085408/http://www.tourismcambodiainfo.com/
 Cambodia Tourism Information - http://www.cambodia-tourism.org/

 
Cambodia